Excellerator is a specialty micronutrient fertilizer produced by the U.S.-based company Harsco Minerals. It is a granular pelletized product used on golf courses, athletic fields and in the lawn and garden market. Excellerator aides in the correction of plant and soil nutrient imbalances and metal toxicities. It provides high concentrations of  plant-available silicon which has been shown in university and field trials to enhance plant resistance to biological and environmental stresses and improve plant nutrient uptake.

How it's made
Excellerator is a co-product of downstream stainless steel furnace slag that undergoes proprietary aging processes, fine grind pulverizing, and extensive metal separation to remove impurities. Over 99.95% of all metals are removed. Particular attention is paid to the removal of "free lime" (CaO and MgO), which disrupts product stability and consistency of performance. The final product contains both calcium and magnesium silicates in addition to a micronutrient package (see table below).

Micronutrient analysis 
(Derived from calcium and magnesium silicates, boric acid, zinc sulfate, and copper sulfate)

Silicon as a beneficial nutrient
The amount of total silicon in Excellerator is 39%. Silicon has been shown to improve plant cell wall strength and structural integrity in many turfgrass species. Other benefits of silicon to plants include increased drought and frost resistance, decreased lodging and improved plant response to pests and disease. Silicon has also been shown to improve plant vigor and physiology, resulting in increases to plant root and above ground biomass. For turfgrass, these benefits may result in better turf quality, color, density, and wear tolerance. Silicon has also been shown effective in enhancing the suppression of diseases, such as grey leaf spot, in a number of warm and cool season turfgrass species.

Silicon is a naturally occurring mineral and the second most abundant element in the earth's crust. In the soil, silicon attaches to soil colloids, helping to reduce compaction and making tied-up nutrients more available. Silicon also allows for a faster, more efficient movement of calcium and magnesium through the soil and readily ties up toxic elements, like aluminium, reducing metal toxicity. In the plant, silicon strengthens cell walls; improving plant strength, health, and productivity. Although not considered an essential element for plant growth and development, silicon is considered a beneficial element in many countries throughout the world due to its many benefits to numerous plant species when under abiotic or biotic stresses. Silicon is currently under consideration by the Association of American Plant Food Control Officials (AAPFCO) for elevation to the status of a "plant beneficial substance."

References

External links 
 turfandsilicon.com
 www.harscominerals.com

Fertilizer companies of the United States